Uruk Sulcus is a bright region of grooved terrain adjacent to Galileo Regio on Jupiter's moon Ganymede. It is thought to be younger than the darker material in Galileo Regio and similar regions elsewhere on the moon.

References

Surface features of Ganymede (moon)
Ganymede (moon)